Arthur M. Lutz is a former Canadian judge of the Court of Queen's Bench of Alberta.

History 
Arthur M. Lutz was born in the Canadian province of Nova Scotia in 1937. Arthur M. Lutz was admitted to the Bar of Alberta in 1961. In 1966, Lutz joined a legal firm in Calgary, Alberta named Lutz, Westerberg, O'Leary, which was later renamed Lutz, Westerberg, O'Leary and Fenerty. Lutz served as president of the Liberal Association of Calgary-Glenmore in 1969 and of the Alberta Liberal Party in 1973. 

In 1982, Lutz was appointed to the Court of Queen's Bench of Alberta.

Notable trials 
Arthur M. Lutz delivered judgment in Wirth v Acadia Pipe & Supply Corp in 1991 and Olson v. New Home Certification Program of Alberta in 1998, each of which have been cited in more than forty subsequent cases. Lutz also delivered judgment in R. v. Jarvis in 1998, which, in its 2002 appeal, has been cited more than five hundred times.

Notes

References

External links 
Professional webpage

Judges in Alberta
1937 births
Living people